The 2004 Tirreno–Adriatico was the 39th edition of the Tirreno–Adriatico cycle race and was held from 10 March to 16 March 2004. The race started in Sabaudia and finished in San Benedetto del Tronto. The race was won by Paolo Bettini of the Quick-Step team.

General classification

References

2004
2004 in Italian sport